Molinara is a red Italian wine grape which accounted for  of planting land in Italy as of 2010, almost exclusively in the Veneto region. It adds acidity to the wines of the Valpolicella and Bardolino regions, which are made with blends of Corvina, Corvinone, Molinara and Rondinella. There has been debate about whether the grape is purple or blue. 

References 

Red wine grape varieties
Wine grapes of Italy
Wine grapes of Veneto